"Out of My Mind" is a song written and sung by Johnny Tillotson, which he released in 1963. The song spent 10 weeks on the Billboard Hot 100 chart, peaking at No. 24, while reaching No. 11 on Billboards Middle-Road Singles chart, No. 28 on Canada's CHUM Hit Parade, No. 34 on the UK's Record Retailer chart, and No. 23 on the UK New Musical Express chart.

Chart performance

References

1963 songs
1963 singles
Johnny Tillotson songs
Songs written by Johnny Tillotson
Cadence Records singles